Pedioplanis branchi is a species of lizard in the family Lacertidae. The species is endemic to Namibia. It is named after the British-born South African herpetologist William Roy Branch.

Pedioplanis branchi measure  in snout–vent length.

References

Pedioplanis
Lacertid lizards of Africa
Reptiles of Namibia
Endemic fauna of Namibia
Reptiles described in 2021
Taxa named by Aaron M. Bauer